Galina Tyuninaslavskaya is a Russian actress, People's Artist of Russia. She appeared in over 30 films.

Biography 
Galina was born on October 13, 1967 in the Primorsky Krai, she studied at the Saratov Theater School (course of V.A.Ermakova) and at GITIS, after which she began acting in films.

Selected filmography

References

External links 
 Galina Tyunina on kino-teatr.ru

Russian film actresses
1967 births
Living people